NTS ASA, formerly Namsos Trafikkselskap, is a public transport company in Trøndelag, Norway. The company operates ferries, local bus services, truck transport and ambulance services. The company has its headquarters in Namsos and the stock is listed on Oslo Stock Exchange.

No single owner is allowed to vote representing more than 0,5% at the annual meeting.

History
Namsos Trafikkselskap was founded in 1970 as a merge between Namsos Dampskipselskap and Namdalen Trafikkselskap.

Operations

Ambulance

Through the subsidiary NTS Ambulanse AS the NTS Group operates a total of 16 ambulances.
On contract with Nord-Trøndelag Hospital Trust NTS operates ambulances in Flatanger, Frosta, Leka, Levanger, Meråker, Namsskogan, Røyrvik, Snåsa and Verdal.
On contract with St. Olavs Health Trust NTS operates ambulances in Osen and Roan.
On contract with Nordmøre og Romsdal Health Trust NTS operates ambulances in Surnadal.
On contract with Innlandet Health Trust NTS operates ambulances in Engedal and Trysil.

Buses

NTS operated local and school bus services in Nærøy until 2008, when operations were sold to TrønderBilene.

Ferries

The company operates seven ships on contract with the Nord-Trøndelag County as part of the public transport in Namdalen. Five of these ships are car ferries.

Trucks

Through the subsidiaries Namdalske AS and Holm Transport AS NTS operates 36 trucks.

Shipping companies of Norway
Ferry companies of Trøndelag
Bus companies of Trøndelag
Ambulance services in Norway
Transport companies established in 1970
1970 establishments in Norway
Companies listed on the Oslo Stock Exchange